Ashley Emerson is an American soprano. She has made more than 60 opera appearances since 2007, including starring roles at major venues; and she has received acclaim from various sources.#

Early life
Daughter of Robert and Beth Emerson, Emerson graduated Bangor High School in her native city of Bangor, Maine. She studied voice at the University of Southern Maine School of Music in Gorham, Maine.

Career
Emerson made her debut at the Metropolitan Opera in New York City in Mozart's The Marriage of Figaro in the bridesmaids choir in 2007; and by 2011 had appeared on stage in 55 Met performances.

She starred as Alice in Unsuk Chin's 2007 opera Alice in Wonderland in its American premiere in 2012 at the Opera Theatre of Saint Louis. In 2010, Emerson appeared in the world premiere of Daron Hagen's opera Amelia as Young Amelia.

In 2017, Emerson starred as Papagena in Mozart's The Magic Flute under the baton of James Levine, with staging by Julie Taymor.

She has starred in several productions, including Gaetano Donizetti's L'elisir d'amore, Benjamin Britten's The Turn of the Screw with Dallas Opera, Gretel in Engelbert Humperdinck's Hansel and Gretel at Seattle Opera, and Francis Poulenc's Dialogues of the Carmelites at the Kennedy Center

As reviewed in Opera News, Emerson's vocal technique has been described as immaculate, concentrated and sweet; "especially when soaring into its upper register."

Personal life

Emerson is married to American tenor Dominic Armstrong. They live in New York City.

Filmography

References

External links
 
 Columbia Artists: Ashley Emerson
 Metropolitan Opera profile
 Opera News: Ashley Emerson
 Musical World: Ashley Emerson

American operatic sopranos
People from Bangor, Maine
Living people
Singers from Maine
21st-century American opera singers
21st-century women opera singers
21st-century American women singers
21st-century American singers
University of Southern Maine alumni
Year of birth missing (living people)